"Violets for Your Furs" is a 1941 song written by Matt Dennis with words by Tom Adair, and first recorded in that year by Tommy Dorsey's orchestra with vocals by Frank Sinatra.

The song describes the wearing of violets with furs on an evening in Manhattan.

Song is said to be about Lana Turner, who was involved with Sinatra at the time. Turner often wore flowers pinned to her furs.

Selected recordings
 Frank Sinatra — Songs for Young Lovers (1954)
 Beverly Kenney — Come Swing with Me (1956)
 John Coltrane — Coltrane (1957)
 Jutta Hipp — Jutta Hipp with Zoot Sims (1957)
 Billie Holiday — Lady in Satin (1958)
 Chet Baker — Chet Baker with Fifty Italian Strings (1959)
 J.R. Monterose — The Message (1959)
 Nat Adderley — Work Song (1960)
 Dave Brubeck Quartet — Angel Eyes (1964)
 Jimmy Roselli — New York: My Port of Call (1965)
 Al Haig — Piano Interpretations (1976)
 Shirley Horn — Violets for Your Furs (1981)
 Johnny Hartman — For Trane (1995), rec. 1972
 Stacey Kent — Dreamsville (2001)
 Barry Manilow — In the Swing of Christmas (2007)

References

1941 songs
Frank Sinatra songs
Songs about New York City
Songs with music by Matt Dennis
Songs written by Tom Adair